Loads Limited is a Pakistani auto-parts maker based in Karachi, Pakistan. It is part of Ali Group of Companies.

History
Loads Limited was founded in 1979. It manufactures exhaust systems, mufflers, radiators and sheet metal components. The company has three manufacturing plants located in Korangi, and Port Bin Qasim in Karachi.

In 2016, companies did an initial public offering (IPO) and raised Rs 1.7 billion.

In December 2017, the company announced that it is setting-up an alloy wheel manufacturing plant in Port Bin Qasim, Karachi. A used plant will be procured from Australia where auto manufacturers are closing plants due to liberal import policy. The plant will have the capacity to produce 500,000 wheels per year.

Products
 Radiator
 Muffler
 Sheet metal components

References

Manufacturing companies based in Karachi
Companies listed on the Pakistan Stock Exchange
2016 initial public offerings
Ali family
Automotive companies established in 1979